Hågat (formerly Agat) is a village in the United States territory of Guam. It is located south of Apra Harbor on the island's western shore. The village's population has decreased since the island's 2010 census.

Some of Agat's most notable sites are Mount Alifan, the Agat Marina, the Spanish Bridge, and War In The Pacific National Historical Park.

History 

In 1565, the Spanish explorer Miguel López de Legazpi claimed Guam for Spain. Agat was founded between 1680 and 1684, by the Spanish Governor Don Jose Quiroga, as a military garrison for the purpose of controlling the Chamorro people and converting them to Christianity. Many of its first citizens were brought from the internal village of Fina which was destroyed while the Spanish pacified the island. It was one of six such settlements on Guam in the 18th century. During the 1830s, the Spanish Governor, Captain Villalobos, began constructing facilities in Agat planning to make it the island's new capital. Lack of funds prevented him from completing the project.

In 1898, Guam was transferred from Spain to the United States following the Spanish–American War. Under U.S. Naval administration, Agat was incorporated as a township with an American style municipal government.

During World War II, Japan occupied Guam from 1941 to 1944. During the Battle of Guam in 1944, Agat was one of the two landing sites for U.S. Marines. These sites are now part of the War in the Pacific National Historical Park. The old village was destroyed during the invasion. After capturing Guam, the U.S. military constructed a new residential community in Agat for Guam residents made homeless by the war south of the original village.

In August 2021, Gov. Lou Leon Guerrero signed a bill officially changing the name of the village.

Demographics
The U.S. Census Bureau counts it under the Agat census-designated place.

Education

Primary and secondary schools

Public schools 
Guam Public School System serves the island.

Marcial Sablan Elementary School and Oceanview Middle School are located in Agat. Southern High School in Santa Rita serves the village.

Oceanview Middle School was originally Oceanview High School; the campus became a middle school in 1997.

Private schools 

Our Lady of Mount Carmel Catholic School is located in Agat and accommodates students in pre-kindergarten through eighth grade.

Public libraries
Guam Public Library System operates the Agat Library at 165 Follard Street.

Government

Deputy Commissioner
 Jose Pereda (1898–1903)
 Jesus Carbullido (1903–1908)
 Pedro C. Charfauros (1931–1933)
 Vicente M. Salas (1934–1937)
 Jose S. San Nicolas (1970–1973)

See also 
 Villages of Guam
 List of census-designated places in Guam

References

Further reading 
 Rogers, Robert F (1995). Destiny's Landfall: A History of Guam: University of Hawai'i Press. 
 Sanchez, Pedro C. Guahan, Guam: The History of our Island: Sanchez Publishing House.

 
Census-designated places in Guam